This is the first edition of the tournament since 1994.

Viktorija Golubic won her first WTA title, defeating Kiki Bertens in the final, 4–6, 6–3, 6-4.

Seeds

Draw

Finals

Top half

Bottom half

Qualifying

Seeds

Qualifiers

Draw

First qualifier

Second qualifier

Third qualifier

Fourth qualifier

Fifth qualifier

Sixth qualifier

References
 Main Draw
 Qualifying Draw

Ladies Championship Gstaad
WTA Swiss Open